Constantine Simonides (1820–1867) was a palaeographer and dealer of icons, known as a man of extensive learning, with significant knowledge of manuscripts and miraculous calligraphy. He was one of the most versatile forgers of the nineteenth century.

Life
He was born on the small Greek island of Symi, in the southeastern Aegean Sea in 1820 (or in 1824), and died in Egypt of leprosy [the report was actually hearsay devised by his English antagonist].

Simonides lived in the monasteries on Mount Athos between 1839 and 1841 and again in 1852, during which time he acquired some of the biblical manuscripts that he later sold. He produced a lot of manuscripts ascribed to Hellenistic and early Byzantine periods. He allegedly forged a number of documents and manuscripts and claimed they were the originals of the Gospel of Mark, as well as original manuscripts of poems of Homer. He sold some of these manuscripts to the King of Greece. Greek scholars exposed what some claimed to be forgeries quickly and he left Greece and traveled from country to country with his manuscripts.

He visited England between 1853 and 1855 and other European countries, and his literary activity was extraordinary. Some of his works were published in Moscow, Odessa, in England, and in Germany. He also wrote many other works which were never published.

From 1843 until 1856 he offered manuscripts purporting to be of ancient origin for sale all over Europe. Frederic G. Kenyon writes that Simonides created "a considerable sensation by producing quantities of Greek manuscripts professing to be of fabulous antiquity – such as a Homer in an almost prehistoric style of writing, a lost Egyptian historian, a copy of St. Matthew's Gospel on papyrus, written fifteen years after the Ascension (!), and other portions of the New Testament dating from the first century. These productions [...] were then exposed as forgeries."

In 1854 and 1855 Simonides tried unsuccessfully to sell some manuscripts for the British Museum and the Bodleian Library. Thomas Phillipps was a less critical purchaser and bought for the Phillipps Library at Cheltenham some manuscripts. In 1855 he visited Berlin and Leipzig. He informed Wilhelm Dindorf that he owned a palimpsest of Uranius.  After this was exposed as a forgery, the print run was destroyed by Oxford University Press after a small number of copies had been sold.

On 13 September 1862, in an article of The Guardian, he claimed that he was the real author of the Codex Sinaiticus and that he wrote it in 1839. According to him it was "the one poor work of his youth". According to Simonides, he visited Sinai in 1852 and saw the codex. Henry Bradshaw, a scholar, did not believe his claims.

Simonides questioned many official scientific positions accepted by scholars. He did not respect any scholars.
He interpreted Egyptian hieroglyphics in different ways from Champollion and other Egyptologists. He tried to prove that his method of interpreting Egyptian hieroglyphics was superior. He placed the death of Irenaeus at 292 (c. 130 – c. 200). Also, in many other complicated questions he had his own, usually controversial, point of view, but after ascribing the authorship of the Codex Sinaiticus to himself, the rest of his credibility was destroyed by the British press.

The Artemidorus Papyrus
In 2006 a papyrus book-roll was exhibited at Turin which appeared to be part of Book II of the lost Geographical Descriptions of Artemidorus Ephesius. It was exhibited again in Berlin in 2008. It has been argued by Luciano Canfora that the manuscript is the work of Constantine Simonides. Richard Janko also believes that the roll is a forgery.

See also
 Some of authentic manuscripts which were bought from Constantine Simonides
 Minuscule 110
 Minuscule 502
 Minuscule 503
 Minuscule 644
 Minuscule 2793

References

Sources
 "Miscellanies", The Journal of Sacred Literature, ed. Harris Cowper, Vol. II, Edinbourgh 1863, pp. 248–253.
 Falconer Madan, Books in manuscript : a short introduction to their study and use. With a Chapter on Records, London 1898, pp. 124–128.

External links
 
 Beschreibung Simonides’ Tätigkeit für eine Ausstellung des Papyrusmuseums der Österreichischen Nationalbibliothek
 William Osler, ‘‘Christianity’’, pp. 1888–1890.
 Forging ahead
 A Collection of Forgeries and Hoaxes
 Rassegna stampa sul portale Archaeogate
 Alexandros Lykourgos, Enthüllungen über den Simonides-Dindorfschen Uranios

1820 births
1890 deaths
Palaeography
Forgers
19th-century Greek people
People from Symi